The 15th Governor General's Awards for Literary Merit were presented on June 13, 1952 for works of Canadian literature published in 1951. The awards in this period had no monetary prize and were just an honour for the authors.

The 1952 awards also introduced new categories, known as the University of Western Ontario President's Awards, to honour individual short works. The awards were presented in three categories, for short stories, poems and magazine articles.

Although administered separately, the Stephen Leacock Memorial Medal for Humour also announced its winner at the same ceremony.

Winners
Fiction — Morley Callaghan, The Loved and the Lost
Poetry or drama — Charles Tory Bruce, The Mulgrave Road
Creative non-fiction — Josephine Phelan, The Ardent Exile
Non-fiction — Frank MacKinnon, The Government of Prince Edward Island
Juvenile — John Francis Hayes, A Land Divided

President's Awards
Short story — Farley Mowat, "Lost in the Barren Lands"
Magazine article — Blair Fraser, "The Secret Life of Mackenzie King, spiritualist"
Poem — Earle Birney, "North Star West"

Stephen Leacock Award
Jan Hilliard, The Salt Box

References

Governor General's Awards
Governor General's Awards
Governor General's Awards